Bruce Katz (1952) is an American musician who plays piano, organ and bass guitar.

Bruce Katz may also refer to:

 Bruce J. Katz (born 1959), urban planner
 Bruce R. Katz (born 1947), American entrepreneur who co-founded the Rockport Shoe Company, later sold to Reebok International